The 2010 ICC Women's Cricket Challenge was an international women's cricket tournament held in South Africa during the 2010–11 international season. South Africa, West Indies, Pakistan, Sri Lanka, Netherlands and Ireland took part in the tournament, held in Potchefstroom from 6 to 16 October 2010. The six teams competed in a series of One Day Internationals (ODIs) and Twenty20s (T20Is).

South Africa remained unbeaten in the ODI tournament to win the competition, and rise two positions to fifth in the Women's ODI rankings. The West Indies' Stafanie Taylor finished as the tournament's top scorer, accumulating 390 runs, including the only century of the competition. Sunette Loubser of South Africa claimed the most wickets, taking 13.

One Day International tournament

Group stage

Twenty20 International tournament

Group stage

Group A

Group B

Knock-out stage

Fifth-place play-off

Third-place play-off

Final

References

External links
Official website
 Series home at ESPN Cricinfo

International cricket competitions in 2010–11
2010 in women's cricket
October 2010 sports events in Africa
International women's cricket competitions in South Africa
2010 in South African cricket
2010 in South African women's sport
2010 in Irish cricket
cricket
2010 in Dutch women's sport
2010 in Pakistani cricket
2010 in Sri Lankan cricket
2010 in West Indian cricket
Women's Twenty20 cricket international competitions
Women's One Day International cricket competitions